Seemann is a surname. Notable people with the surname include:

 Berthold Carl Seemann (1825–1871), German botanist
 Carl Seemann (1910–1983), German pianist and 1978 recipient of the Reinhold-Schneider-Preis
 Finn  Seemann (1944–1985), Norwegian footballer
  (1887–1963), German art director for The Beaver Coat (1928 film)
 Horst Seemann (1937–2000), German film director and screenwriter
 Lindsay Seemann (born 1992), Canadian swimmer
 "Seemann" (Lolita song), released 1960 by Austrian singer Lolita
 "Seemann" (Rammstein song), a 1996 single by the German band Rammstein

See also

 Seeman (disambiguation)
 Zeeman (disambiguation)